Acoustic is an album by British rock band Love Amongst Ruin and features acoustic versions of eight tracks released on the band's debut album. It was released on 5 December 2011.

Background

The band spent two days at Fisher Lane Farm in early August 2011 with producer Paul Corkett to record acoustic versions of nine tracks released on their self-titled debut album. Former member Laurie Ross returned to play cello at the sessions. The album's liner notes state "These versions and the speed with which they were recorded, represent a natural progression that comes from our familiarity with the tracks, having played them repeatedly throughout the course of our numerous live shows in 2010 and 2011".

Release

The album was released on 5 December 2011 via Bandcamp as a CD and digital download. The album was preceded by the release of an acoustic version of "Bring Me Down (You Don't)", which was given away by the band as a free download on SoundCloud on 8 November 2011.

Track listing

Personnel
Steve Hewitt - vocals
Donald Ross Skinner - guitar, backing vocals
Steve Hove - guitar, backing vocals
Teresa Morini - bass
Ramon Sherrington - drums, percussion
Laurie Ross - cello, keyboards, backing vocals

References

2011 albums
Love Amongst Ruin albums